Amidst the Chaos is the sixth studio album by American singer-songwriter Sara Bareilles, released on April 5, 2019, through Epic Records. The lead single from the album, "Armor", was released digitally on October 26, 2018. The album debuted at number six on the US Billboard 200 selling 35,000 copies in its first week (29,000 of which were traditional album sales), making it Bareilles' sixth top 10 album. "Saint Honesty" earned Bareilles a Grammy Award for Best American Roots Performance at the 2020 ceremony.

Background
In an interview with Forbes, Bareilles stated that the 2016 American Presidential Election was the catalyst for her beginning to write the album, with the title being a reference to the presidency of Donald Trump. The song "No Such Thing" was written as an ode to president Barack Obama, while "Armor" was written in response to the #MeToo Movement and released early in light of the confirmation hearing of Supreme Court Justice Brett Kavanaugh. The duet with John Legend, "A Safe Place to Land", was written about the immigrant family separation crisis along the US–Mexico border in 2018.

Promotion
The lead single, "Armor", was released on October 28, 2018, with Bareilles performing the song on The Late Show with Stephen Colbert on November 28, backed by an all-female band. She announced the album on February 13, and said it would become available to pre-order on February 15. She also posted the cover art, a black-and-white shot of herself with "windblown hair".

Prior to the album's release, Bareilles embarked upon the four-date A Little Chaos Tour, stopping in San Francisco, Los Angeles, Chicago and New York City between March 17 and 22, 2019. Bareilles performed several unreleased songs from the album, as well as its promotional singles. On April 6, 2019, Bareilles appeared as a musical guest on Saturday Night Live and performed "Fire" and "Saint Honesty".

Reception

Track listing

Personnel
Credits adapted from the album's liner notes.

Musicians
 Sara Bareilles – vocals; piano on tracks 2, 3, 5, 7, 9, 11, 12; programming on tracks 1, 2, 3, 9; electric guitar on track 5
 John Legend – vocals on track 12
 Emily King – vocal harmonies on track 4
 Jim Keltner – drums on tracks 1, 4, 5, 6, 7, 10, 12; percussion on tracks 5, 9
 Jay Bellerose – drums on tracks 2, 3, 8, 9, 11, 12;  percussion on track 12
 Mike Piersante – percussion on tracks 1, 4, 7, 11
 Dennis Crouch – acoustic bass on all tracks; electric bass on track 8
 Zachary Dawes – electric bass on track 5; 6-string bass on track 7
 Marc Ribot – guitar on tracks 3, 4, 5, 6, 7, 9, 10, 12; ukulele on track 10
 Blake Mills – guitar on tracks 1, 2, 8, 11; mandolin on track 1, 6-string bass on track 2
 Joseph Ryan – guitar on track 10; vocal harmonies on track 10
 T Bone Burnett – guitar on track 8
 Patrick Warren – keyboards on all tracks except 1, 10, 11
 Keefus Ciancia – keyboards on tracks 3, 9
 Philip Krohnengold (misspelled "Khronengold" in booklet) – piano on track 4
 Gabriel Johnson – trumpet on track 3

Production
 Produced by T Bone Burnett
 Executive Producer: Pete Giberga
 2nd Engineers: Billy Centenaro, Karl Wingate, Joseph Lorge
 Edited by Jason Wormer
 Recorded at The Village, West Los Angeles, CA and Sound City Studios, Van Nuys, CA
 Mixed at The Village, West Los Angeles, CA
 String Arrangements by Patrick Warren
 Copying by Danita Ng-Poss; Jason Poss
 Equipment Manager & Production: Zach Dawes
 Guitar Technicians: Patrick Benson, Joseph Lorge
 Piano Technician: Carl Lieberman, RPT
 Mastered by Gavin Lurssen at Lurssen Mastering, Burbank, CA
 Production Coordinator & Contractor: Ivy Skoff

Charts

References

2019 albums
Sara Bareilles albums
Epic Records albums
Albums produced by T Bone Burnett
Albums recorded at Sound City Studios